Victoria is a 2015 German crime thriller film directed by Sebastian Schipper. The film stars Laia Costa and Frederick Lau. It is one of the few feature films shot in a single continuous take.

Plot
Victoria is a Spanish woman who moved to Berlin and has been living there for three months. She works in a cafe for a meagre wage, and does not know anybody in the city. In addition, she does not speak much German, and her only common language with the people around her is English. Leaving a club at around 4 o’clock in the morning after a night of dancing and drinking, she meets four young men who are denied entry to the club. They are “Sonne” (sun), “Boxer”, “Blinker” (turn signal), and “Fuß” (foot). The men invite her to take a walk through the city and she agrees. After stealing some alcohol from an all night shop, they all get on the roof of an apartment building where they drink and smoke marijuana together, while Boxer reveals that he spent time in jail for hurting someone.

When Victoria tells the others that she has to leave because she must open up the cafe she works at in a short time, Sonne, who was flirting with her the whole time, suggests accompanying her there and she agrees. When Sonne leaves with her, he is told by Boxer to return soon. It is implied that the four men have something important to do this night.

When Victoria and Sonne arrive at the cafe, she invites him in for a cup of coffee, but he insists he only drinks chocolate milk. While the two are alone inside, Sonne notices a piano, tinkles a bit on it and then dares Victoria to also play something. After much coaxing, she sits down and masterfully plays one of the Mephisto Waltzes, deeply impressing and moving Sonne. She then reveals that she had dedicated her whole life to the dream of becoming a concert pianist but had been told a short time ago at her music school that she was not good enough to continue.

Shortly after, an extremely nervous and agitated Boxer arrives and demands that Sonne leave with him immediately. In front of the cafe, the four men steal a car and drive away, only to come back a few minutes later because Fuß, who had been heavily intoxicated before, has now fallen unconscious. A desperate Boxer demands that Sonne ask Victoria to replace Fuß and help them. Sonne is reluctant at first, but finally does what Boxer asked. He tells Victoria that Boxer had been under the protection of gangster Andi while he was in prison and now Andi demands that Boxer pays him back for his services. For this, Andi has asked Boxer to get three allies and bring them to a meeting with him this night. None of the four men knows the purpose of the meeting. To Sonne's surprise, Victoria immediately agrees to help. She drives Sonne, Boxer, Blinker and Fuß (who is lying in the back of the car) to the meeting place, a parking garage where Andi is waiting with several armed men. He demands that the four head to a specific bank to rob €50,000 from it the very same morning. Andi says he will collect €10,000 as payback and leave the rest of the money to them. The four agree to the robbery after Andi threatens to take Victoria hostage if they refuse. They are armed with guns, given a plan of the bank and then forced to take drugs to make them more alert and aggressive.

While Victoria is driving to the bank, Blinker has a panic attack, but the others eventually calm him down. Feeling guilty about involving Victoria and causing his friend's panic attack, Boxer says he will rob the bank alone, but the others, including Victoria, tell him that they will still help. The robbery itself goes smoothly, even though Victoria stalls the car in front of the bank while the others are inside. After leaving the car in a back alley, the four, euphoric after the success of the robbery and still under the influence of the drugs, return to the club to celebrate. While Sonne and Victoria are kissing, Blinker and Boxer in their excitement strip naked on the dance floor, leading to all four being thrown out of the club. Outside, they remember that they have left the unconscious Fuß back in the car. When they return to the back alley, they see that the police have already found the car. Panicking, they leave the scene but are noticed by plainclothes police officers. Boxer, Blinker and Sonne draw their guns and all four run away. A shootout ensues during which Blinker is hit and left behind by the other three. Boxer implores Sonne and Victoria to take the money and flee while he confronts the police. Sonne and Victoria flee to find safety and Boxer is shot at by police.

Sonne and Victoria manage to enter an apartment building unseen, and take a young couple hostage in one of the apartments. When they notice that the couple has a baby, they change clothes, take the baby with them and leave the apartment, under the desperate cries of the mother. When encountered by the police, they manage to give the impression that they are a young family and are allowed to leave the building.

They leave the baby in front of a café across the street and hail a taxi which brings them to a nearby hotel. There, Victoria reserves a room while Sonne waits, writhing in great pain. On the way to their room, Victoria notices that Sonne has been shot. Lying down on the hotel bed, he watches the news, learning that Boxer died during the shootout, and Blinker died while being taken to the hospital. Victoria then notices that Sonne is bleeding profusely from his wound. Sonne urges Victoria to "go and take the money" as no one knows who she is. Victoria calls an ambulance but Sonne dies a few moments later holding Victoria's hands and she breaks down crying. After pulling herself together, she notices the money on the floor, picks it up, walks out of the hotel and is seen walking down the street.

Cast
 Laia Costa as Victoria
 Frederick Lau as Sonne
 Franz Rogowski as Boxer
 Max Mauff as Fuß
  as Blinker
 André Hennicke as Andi

Production
The film was shot in a single long take by Sturla Brandth Grøvlen from about 4.30 am to 7.00 am on 27 April 2014 in the Kreuzberg and Mitte neighborhoods. The script consisted of 12 pages, with most of the dialogue being improvised.

To get financiers onboard, director Sebastian Schipper promised to deliver a version using traditional shot cutting as “plan B” if he couldn't achieve the final product in a true single take. The cut version was filmed first, over 10 days, as a series of 10-minute takes, so that Schipper would have a completed film in the bag even if the one-take version failed. Schipper has characterised the cut version as “not good”. The budget permitted only three attempts at the one-take version. According to Schipper, the first attempt was dull because the actors were too cautious, being afraid to make mistakes; the second attempt was the opposite, as the actors went “crazy”. Schipper says he became “angry” and “terrified” after seeing the second take and realizing he had only one chance left; in a subsequent meeting, he gave the cast a “hairdryer speech ... [it] was not a meeting that ended in hugs and 'good talk.' It was crazy. But the tension was built on knowing we wanted the same thing”. Schipper believes the final attempt was successful because there was an element of “aggression” missing from the other versions.

Soundtrack
The score was composed and produced by Nils Frahm; an album version of the soundtrack was released on 12 June 2015.

Reception

Critical response
On Rotten Tomatoes, the film has a rating of 82%, based on 124 reviews, with an average rating of 7.6/10. The website's critical consensus states: "Victoria single-take production is undeniably impressive, but it's also an effective drama in its own right – and one that juggles its tonal shifts as deftly as its technical complexities." On Metacritic, the film has a weighted average score of 77 out of 100, based on 27 critics, indicating "generally favorable reviews".

The Hollywood Reporter described the film as a "kinetic, frenetic, sense-swamping rollercoaster ride" but said the plot was somewhat implausible. Variety reviewed the film well, calling it "suffused with a surprising degree of grace and emotional authenticity."

Accolades
At the German Film Award 2015, Victoria received the awards for Best Fiction Film, Direction, Actress in a Leading Role (Costa), Actor in a Leading Role (Lau), Cinematography and Music. It was also nominated for Best Sound Design.

It screened in the main competition section of the 65th Berlin International Film Festival where the film's cinematographer Sturla Brandth Grøvlen won a Silver Bear for Outstanding Artistic Contribution for Cinematography. It received the German Film Award in six categories, including Best Fiction Film. It was selected for the Special Presentations section of the 2015 Toronto International Film Festival. It was one of eight films shortlisted by Germany to be its submission for the Academy Award for Best Foreign Language Film at the 88th Academy Awards. However, it lost out to Labyrinth of Lies, after it was disqualified by the Academy because of its high percentage of English dialogue. In 2017, Laia Costa was nominated for an EE Rising Star Award for her performance in the film at the 70th British Academy Film Awards.

References

External links
 
 

2015 films
2015 crime drama films
2015 crime thriller films
2015 thriller drama films
2010s English-language films
2010s German-language films
2010s heist films
English-language German films
Films about bank robbery
Films directed by Sebastian Schipper
Films set in Berlin
Films shot in Berlin
German crime drama films
German crime thriller films
German thriller drama films
One-shot films
Silver Bear for outstanding artistic contribution
2010s German films